Aylsham High School is a secondary school in the market town of Aylsham north of Norwich, in the English county of Norfolk. It has around 1,000 pupils ranging in age from 11 to 16. Duncan Spalding is the head teacher. The school catchment area includes the town of Aylsham and surrounding villages, including Aldborough, Buxton, Colby, Erpingham and Marsham.

In May 2011 the school was judged to be overall "outstanding" by Ofsted, the English school inspections service.
As of its most recent Ofsted report, the school has received a rating of "good".

History
Aylsham is the last secondary school in Norfolk to remain with the council as a foundation school.

Mentoring

Friendly Faces is a peer support group run by year 10 and 11 pupils. Day to day they offer drop in sessions for other pupils to discuss problems and patrol the playground wearing orange hi-vis jackets. In addition to this the team visit local primary schools in the summer term to prepare year 6 pupils for high school, run training and selection days for new friendly faces and promote anti-bullying throughout the school. In 2012 they hosted an Anti-Bullying conference for the Norfolk Region on behalf of the Diana award Anti-Bullying Ambassadors Programme with Alex Holmes. In 2013 they were invited to London to Facebook HQ for a showcase of best practice in school of antibullying work.

The project, first introduced in 2001, has 20 senior Friendly Faces in year 11 who support a team of 40 year 10 friendly faces at the school. Originally the programme aimed to support pupils who felt they were victims of bullying. The project was later broadened to support any and all issues pupils may face.

Awards won

2015 – Diana Award Anti-Bullying Champions
2014 – Bernard Matthews Youth Awards Finalists
2014 - Diana Award Anti-Bullying Champions
2013 - Diana Award Anti-Bullying Champions
2013 – Bernard Matthews Youth Awards finalists
2012 – Diana Award Anti-Bullying Champions
2011 – Diana Award Anti-Bullying Champions
2010 – Diana Award Anti-Bullying Champions
2009 – Diana Award
2008 – Diana Award
2007 – Diana Award
2007 – Philip Lawrence Award
2006 – Diana Award

References

External links
School profile
Aylsham High School Web site

Secondary schools in Norfolk
Foundation schools in Norfolk
Aylsham